Luis Hernández Bretón was a Mexican film composer.

Selected filmography
 The Lieutenant Nun (1944)
 Hypocrite (1949)
 Oh Darling! Look What You've Done! (1951)
 Chucho the Mended (1952)
 Snow White (1952)
 Él (1953)
 Sonatas (1959)
 The White Sister (1960)
 La Tía Alejandra (1979)

References

Bibliography 
 Freddy Buache. Bunuel. L'AGE D'HOMME, 1980.

External links 
 

Year of birth unknown
Year of death unknown
Mexican composers